Saint Maria Goretti High School was an all-female Roman Catholic high school located at 1736 South Tenth Street in the South Philadelphia area of Philadelphia, Pennsylvania, United States. In 2004 the school, which was a part of the Roman Catholic Archdiocese of Philadelphia, merged with Saint John Neumann High School to form Saints John Neumann and Maria Goretti Catholic High School.

History
Goretti opened in 1955. In 1992 Goretti had 970 students. In October 1992 consultants told the archdiocese that Neumann and Goretti should be consolidated onto Neumann's site. By December of that year the archdiocese decided not to consolidate the two schools. In 2003 Goretti had 683 students and the school had a stable financial situation. By then the combined populations of both schools declined by 29 percent in an 11-year span. In March 2003 the archdiocese asked the faculty and staff of Neumann to consider merging or closing the school as the school had increasing deficits and a decreasing student population. In June of that year the committees unanimously requested a merge. In September of that year Cardinal Anthony Bevilacqua, the head of the Philadelphia Archdiocese, decided that the merge should occur.

See also

References

External links
 

Defunct girls' schools in the United States
Educational institutions established in 1955
Educational institutions disestablished in 2004
Defunct Catholic secondary schools in Pennsylvania
Defunct schools in Pennsylvania
1955 establishments in Pennsylvania
South Philadelphia
Italian-American culture in Philadelphia
Girls' schools in Pennsylvania